Monkey Forest may refer to:

 Ubud Monkey Forest, Bali, Indonesia
 Trentham Monkey Forest, Staffordshire, England